Apostolepis nigroterminata, the Peru blackhead or Peru burrowing snake, is a species of snake in the family Colubridae. It is found in Peru, Brazil, and Bolivia.

References 

nigroterminata
Reptiles described in 1896
Reptiles of Peru
Reptiles of Brazil
Reptiles of Bolivia
Taxa named by George Albert Boulenger